KAIZ may refer to:

 KAIZ (FM), a radio station (105.5 FM) licensed to Avondale, Arizona, United States
 Lee C. Fine Memorial Airport (ICAO code KAIZ)